George Kerr (born 1805) was a Scottish-born lawyer and politician in New Brunswick. He represented Northumberland County in the Legislative Assembly of New Brunswick from 1852 to 1870.

He was born in Kirkcudbright and educated there. In 1832, he was called to the bar. He married a Miss Abrams and then married Miss Swayne after the death of his first wife.

References 
The Canadian parliamentary companion HJ Morgan (1869)

1805 births
Members of the Legislative Assembly of New Brunswick
People from Kirkcudbright
Year of death missing
Colony of New Brunswick people
Scottish emigrants to pre-Confederation New Brunswick